The Abbey Road Sessions is a 2011 studio album by Welsh musician Ian Shaw. It was released on 14 March 2011 by Splash Point Records.

Critical reception

In a review for The Guardian, jazz critic John Fordham wrote "Shaw is cool but never calculatingly crooner-hip. Perhaps he occasionally embroiders too much for lyrics lovers, and the band might have welcomed a few more hours together, but this is a fitting document for one of the UK's most honest and musical jazz vocalists." At JazzTimes, Christopher Loudon explained: "Shaw was positively fizzing with excitement. It must have also been the launch of his lushly arranged latest album The Abbey Road Sessions... he's in danger of becoming a national treasure."

Track listing

Personnel
Ian Shaw - vocals
Peter Ind - double bass (all tracks except track 5)
David Preston - guitar
Phil Ware - piano
Gene Calderazzo - drums
Zhenya Strigalev - alto saxophone
Miguel Gorodi - trumpet
David BeeBee - double bass (on track 5)

External links
Official website
Splash Point Records

References

Ian Shaw (singer) albums
2011 albums